The 2011–12 Ranji Trophy season is the 78th Ranji trophy season. It is being contested through two leagues: Super and Plate. Each division is divided into 2 groups – A and B, each team plays all the other teams from its group only once either home or away.

The Super League is divided into two groups of eight and seven teams, while the Plate League is divided into two groups of six teams each. The top two from each Plate sub-group contest semi-finals; the winners of these two matches then join the top three from each Super League sub-group in an eight-team knock-out tournament. The winner of this knock-out tournament then wins the Ranji Trophy. Knock-out matches are decided on the first innings result if the result is a draw.

Points summary
Points in the league stages of both divisions are awarded as follows:

note* – If match ends in a draw.

Teams

Super League

Group A
 Mumbai
 Karnataka
 Uttar Pradesh
 Saurashtra
 Punjab
 Railways
 Rajasthan
 Orissa

Group B
 Baroda
 Madhya Pradesh
 Tamil Nadu
 Gujarat
 Haryana
 Bengal
 Delhi

Plate League

Group A
 Kerala
 Vidarbha
 Himachal
 Andhra Pradesh
 Services
 Tripura

Group B
 Hyderabad
 Maharashtra
 Goa
 Jammu & Kashmir
 Jharkhand (formerly known as Bihar)
 Assam

Points Table

Super League

Super league – Group A

Super League – Group B

Plate League 
Plate League – Group A

Plate League – Group B

Knock-out Stage

Plate League
The two top teams from each group of the Plate league will meet in semi-finals, the winners of which will qualify for quarter-finals of the Super league.

Super League
The top three teams of each group of the Super league along with the two winners of the semi-finals from plate league will qualify for the quarter-finals.

Semi-finals

Final

Statistics

Most Runs

Most Wickets

References and notes

External links
Official website
Ranji Trophy Super League 2011/12
Ranji Trophy Plate League 2011/12

Ranji Trophy seasons
Ranji Trophy